Fjelsted Speedway Klub or Team Fjelsted is a speedway club from the village of Fjelsted near Harndrup in Denmark, who compete in the Danish Speedway League.

History
A mini speedway track was built in the spring of 1971 in an old apple garden, before a larger track was built in 1976 after a lease agreement with a local farm owner was reached. The opening meeting took place during Easter 1976. 
 
The team have won the Danish Speedway League title on 5 occasions in 1982, 1986, 1992, 1995 and 2019.

Teams

2022 team

References 

Danish speedway teams